Bangladesh National Nutrition Council (BNNC) is an autonomous government body responsible for planning National Food and Nutrition Policy in Bangladesh and is located in Mohammadpur Thana, Dhaka, Bangladesh. The council is chaired by the Prime Minister.

History
Bangladesh National Nutrition Council was established in 1975 on the orders of the President of Bangladesh. Since 1998 the council observes National Nutrition Week every year at national, district, and upazila level. The council publishes a journal twice every year called the South Asian Journal of Nutrition. The council also helps plan nutritional nutrient programs for relevant seventeen ministries. In 1994 with the help of the World Bank it carried out a national nutritional survey.

References

Research institutes in Bangladesh
1975 establishments in Bangladesh
Nutrition organizations
Organisations based in Dhaka